Tomislav Vranjić (born 30 October 1983) is a Croatian retired football goalkeeper who last played for German side BFC Tur Abdin.

References

External links
 
 

1983 births
Living people
Sportspeople from Vinkovci
Association football goalkeepers
Croatian footballers
Croatia youth international footballers
Croatia under-21 international footballers
HNK Cibalia players
NK Varaždin players
GNK Dinamo Zagreb players
NK Inter Zaprešić players
Athlitiki Enosi Larissa F.C. players
Damash Gilan players
Croatian Football League players
Super League Greece players
Azadegan League players
Kazakhstan Premier League players
Kazakhstan First Division players
First Football League (Croatia) players
Landesliga players
Croatian expatriate footballers
Expatriate footballers in Greece
Croatian expatriate sportspeople in Greece
Expatriate footballers in Iran
Croatian expatriate sportspeople in Iran
Expatriate footballers in Kazakhstan
Croatian expatriate sportspeople in Kazakhstan
Expatriate footballers in Germany
Croatian expatriate sportspeople in Germany